Silvestro Durante (died 1672) was an Italian church musician and composer.

Durante was a student of the composer Giacomo Carissimi. From 1645 to 1662 he was maestro di cappella of the Basilica of Santa Maria in Trastevere in Rome, although in December 1637 he was already referred to as the "maestro" of church music at the Basilica, and in 1664 he was still called maestro di capella.

Some of Durante's works are in the Düben collection in the Uppsala University Library.

References

1672 deaths
Italian male classical composers
Italian Baroque composers
Year of birth unknown
17th-century Italian composers
17th-century male musicians